Mummery may refer to:

 Mummery Cliff
Mummery tent
Christmas Mummering
 Performance of a Mummers' play.
 Mummery (surname)